County Road 916, also known as Nykvågveien (Nykvåg Road) or Vågveien (Bay Road), is a  asphalt road in the municipality of Bø in Nordland County, Norway. The name Nykvågveien is also shared with County Road 915.

The road starts at the village of Nykvåg, where it branches off from County Road 915. It circles southwest and then northeast around the bay at Nykvåg, ending at Nykvåg Quay (Nykvåg kai). There is a bird cliff along the road that is part of the Nykvåg/Nykan Nature Reserve.

References

External links
Statens vegvesen – trafikkmeldinger Fv916 (Traffic Information: County Road 916)

916
Bø, Nordland